Southern Railway 1401 is a 4-6-2 steam locomotive built in July 1926 by the American Locomotive Company (ALCO) of Richmond, Virginia for the Southern Railway (SOU) as a member of the Ps-4 class, which was based on the United States Railroad Administration (USRA) Heavy Pacific design with some minor differences. It was assigned to haul the SOU's Crescent Limited passenger train between Washington, D.C., and Atlanta, Georgia. Painted in a Virginian green and gold paint scheme, No. 1401 and the other Ps-4s were signified as the "First Ladies of the Pacifics" around the SOU system. Originally built with Baker valve gear and alligator crossheads, the Ps-4s were eventually re-equipped with Walschaerts valve gear and multiple-bearing crossheads in the mid-late 1930s.

During 1945, No. 1401 was assigned to haul the funeral train of U.S. President Franklin D. Roosevelt. Retired from revenue service by the SOU in 1952, No. 1401 was donated to the National Museum of American History in Washington, D.C., around 1961, where it currently remains on permanent static display as the sole survivor of the Southern Railway Ps-4 class.

History

Design and appearances
During the 1920s, the Southern Railway's (SOU) roster consisted of smaller P-1, Ps-2, Ps-3, and P-5 class 4-6-2 Light Pacifics that could not handle the longer and heavier mainline passenger trains between Washington, D.C., and Atlanta, Georgia. Therefore, the SOU ordered the more powerful 4-6-2 Heavy Pacific Ps-4 class with a total of 27 locomotives (Nos. 1366–1392), built between 1923 and 1924 by the American Locomotive Company (ALCO) of Schenectady, New York, and were originally painted black with gold linings and lettering. The Ps-4s were based on the United States Railroad Administration (USRA) Heavy Pacific design, differing in that they lacked the smaller  driving wheels, and included a slightly shorter boiler, an additional firebox combustion chamber, and a Worthington 3-B type feedwater heater.

During 1925, SOU president Fairfax Harrison traveled to the United Kingdom where he admired the country's London and North Eastern Railway's (LNER) apple-green Gresley A1-class locomotives, which inspired him to repaint the Ps-4s in a new Virginian green and gold paint scheme. This included the second batches of twelve locomotives (Nos. 1393–1404) built in the summer of 1926 by ALCO's Richmond Works in Richmond, Virginia, at a cost of  each. Additionally, they were equipped with an Elesco feedwater heater as opposed to the Worthington type. Because of the Ps-4s' glamorous Virginian green and gold paint scheme, they were signified as the "First Ladies of the Pacifics" around the SOU system.

In 1928, the last batch of five Ps-4s (Nos. 1405–1409) were built by the Baldwin Locomotive Works (BLW) in Philadelphia, Pennsylvania, at a cost of $57,000 each. While the 1923–1926 batches were equipped with Baker valve gear, the 1928 locomotives were built with Walschaerts valve gears. No. 1409 was experimentally equipped with a Coffin feedwater heater, which was later removed in the 1940s in favor of the Worthington SA type.

Nos. 1366–1404 were eventually re-equipped with Walschaerts valve gears in the mid-late 1930s. Additionally, all of the Ps-4s were re-equipped with multiple-bearing crossheads as opposed to their original alligator crossheads. In the 1940s, Nos. 1366–1409 were all rebuilt with the higher and straighter front running board to allow more room around their cylinders and running gear for the crew to maintain the mechanical lubricating system.

Revenue service and retirement

No. 1401 was the forty-sixth member of the Ps-4 class and was one of the second batches built in 1926. It was assigned to pull the SOU's Crescent Limited passenger train, mostly on the SOU's Charlotte Division between Salisbury, North Carolina, and Atlanta. In April 1945, No. 1401 became one of the eight Ps-4 locomotives to haul the funeral train of U.S. President Franklin Roosevelt from Atlanta to Washington, D.C. No. 1401's last heavy repairs took place at SOU's Spencer Shops in Spencer, North Carolina, on May 21, 1951.

In November 1952, the No. 1401 locomotive was retired after it finished its last revenue run on the SOU's Danville Division between Salisbury and Monroe, Virginia. It had traveled nearly  during its revenue service. During that time, railfan Walter H. Thrall and SOU board member W. Graham Claytor Jr. convinced SOU president Harry A. DeButts to spare one of the Ps-4 locomotives from the scrap line and donate it to the Smithsonian Institution in Washington, D.C. In early 1953, the No. 1401 locomotive was chosen for preservation and was towed to Alexandria, Virginia, to be stored at the Henry Street Yard to await the Smithsonian's decision. In 1955, the Smithsonian announced that they would put the No. 1401 locomotive on display inside their new Museum of History and Technology exhibition building.

In 1961, the No. 1401 locomotive was cosmetically restored and transported via flatbed truck to the Smithsonian's under construction Museum of History and Technology building, which opened in early 1964 and later renamed to National Museum of American History in 1980 to reflect its scope of American history. The No. 1401 locomotive currently remains on permanent static display at the Smithsonian as the sole survivor of the Southern Railway Ps-4 class.

See also
 Atlanta and West Point 290
 Atlantic Coast Line 1504
 London and North Eastern Railway 4472 Flying Scotsman
 Norfolk and Western 578
 Southern Railway 722
 Southern Railway 4501

Notes

References

Bibliography

External links

 Steam Locomotive, Southern Railway 1401 - Smithsonian Institution

4-6-2 locomotives
ALCO locomotives
Artifacts in the collection of the Smithsonian Institution
Franklin D. Roosevelt
Individual locomotives of the United States
Preserved steam locomotives of Washington, D.C.
Railway locomotives introduced in 1926
Standard gauge locomotives of the United States
Steam locomotives of Southern Railway (U.S.)